General elections were held in Bahrain in November and December 2018 to elect the 40 members of the Council of Representatives. The first round of voting was on Saturday, 24 November, with a second round in 31 constituencies on Saturday, 1 December. A municipal poll coincided with the parliamentary vote.

The elections were considered to be a sham, as they followed a government crackdown on dissent that included prohibiting members of dissolved opposition groups from running. Following the 2011 Bahraini protests, all 18 Al Wefaq members on the Council resigned, and were barred from contesting the subsequent by-elections. Since 2011, authorities have imprisoned hundreds of dissidents, including Al Wefaq leader Sheikh Ali Salman, and stripped many of Bahraini citizenship. Al Wefaq boycotted the 2014 Bahraini general election.

The two main opposition groups, the Shiite Al-Wefaq and secular Waad, were barred from fielding candidates in 2018, prompting renewed calls for a boycott. A court banned Al Wefaq in 2016 for "harbouring terrorism", inciting violence and encouraging demonstrations which threatened to spark sectarian strife. On 17 July 2016, Saudi-owned Al Arabiya television and international print media reported that Bahrain's highest court dissolved Al Wefaq and liquidated the group's funds.

Electoral system
The 40 members of the Council of Representatives were elected from single-member constituencies using a two-round system; if no candidate received a majority of the vote in the first round, a second round was held.

Constituencies
Each governorate is divided into a number of constituencies for the election for the Council of Representatives. Each constituency is listed as area 1, area 2 etc. Each constituency elects one member. Only Bahraini nationals are entitled to stand for and to vote at elections.

Campaign
Candidates had to apply between 17 and 21 October 2018, with 293 registering to contest the 40 seats.

Results
Nine of the 40 constituencies were decided in the first round, with the other 31 going to a runoff. According to the government, voter turnout in the first round was 67%, an increase from 53% in the 2014 elections. However, the opposition claimed that the real voter turnout did not exceed 28%-30%.

List of elected members

References

Elections in Bahrain
2018 in Bahrain
Bahrain
Election and referendum articles with incomplete results
November 2018 events in Asia
December 2018 events in Asia